Tapalaya was a Vietnamese-Cajun restaurant owned by chef Anh Luu in the Kerns neighborhood of Portland, Oregon, United States. The restaurant closed in 2019, and was replaced by a vegan restaurant called The Sudra.

History
Tapalaya opened in northeast Portland in 2008. In her role as head chef, Luu "rebooted" the restaurant's menu in 2014, then purchased Tapalaya in 2017. She competed on Chopped in 2015, and her "Chicken, Shrimp, and Andouille Sausage Gumbo" recipe was included in Portland Cooks, Recipes from the City’s Best Restaurants & Bars (2017).

The restaurant was burgled in February 2019, and participated in Portland Dining Month. It was included in the Portland Mercury "100 Portland Happy Hours: Northeast" list in 2019.

Tapalaya closed in 2019 when Luu relocated to New Orleans. The Oregonian Michael Russell included Tapalaya is his list of "Portland's most painful restaurant closures of 2019".

Reception
In 2018, The Oregonian ranked Tapalaya one of North and Northeast Portland's 40 best restaurants.

See also
 List of Cajun restaurants
 List of defunct restaurants of the United States
 List of Vietnamese restaurants

References

External links

 
 
 

2008 establishments in Oregon
2019 disestablishments in Oregon
Defunct Asian restaurants in Portland, Oregon
Defunct Cajun restaurants in the United States
Kerns, Portland, Oregon
Northeast Portland, Oregon
Restaurants disestablished in 2019
Restaurants established in 2008
Vietnamese restaurants in Portland, Oregon